This is a list of electoral results for the Electoral district of Glen Waverley in Victorian state elections.

Members for Glen Waverley

Election results

Elections in the 2020s

Elections in the 1990s

Elections in the 1980s

References

Victoria (Australia) state electoral results by district